WCJW (1140 kHz) is a commercial AM radio station licensed to Warsaw, New York and serving Western New York.  It is owned by Lloyd Lane, Inc, and calls itself "CJ Country."  The radio studios and transmitter are on Merchant Road in Warsaw.

WCJW broadcasts at 8,000 watts during daytime hours using a directional antenna with a two-tower array.  During critical hours, the power is reduced to 2,300 watts. 

It is required by the FCC to sign off at sunset, though effectively the AM station now merely serves as a de facto relay to a network of six co-owned FM translators to provide full-time service, which are all promoted over the AM signal, which is only mentioned during the hourly station identification.

Programmning
The station's format is centered on country music, using a "traditional country" approach, playing classic country hits with more recent releases included in the playlist.  WCJW also airs local news, weather, high school sports, and agriculture reports.  Other popular features include WCJW's daily Tradio program and weekend coverage of NASCAR races.  National news service is provided by Fox News Radio.

In contrast to many small-market radio stations, WCJW maintains a local programming staff.  On weekdays, it only carries syndicated programming ("CMT After Midnite") during overnight hours. Weekend shows heard on WCJW include When Radio Was and Rise Up Country.

Coverage area
WCJW is the only AM station in Wyoming County and the only broadcast station in the county with a local studio (WLKK is licensed to Wethersfield in Wyoming County, but has its main studios in the Buffalo suburb of Amherst).

In addition to the county seat of Warsaw, targeted communities include Perry, Silver Springs, Castile, Gainesville, Arcade, and Attica, along with the Livingston County villages of Geneseo, Mount Morris, Nunda, Avon and Caledonia, and the Genesee County municipalities of Batavia and Le Roy.

Translators
In June 2008, WCJW began simulcasting its programming on FM translator W279BO in Warsaw, a 250-watt facility collocated with the studio and AM transmitter.  In November 2008, W288BZ began operating on 105.5 MHz from the Genesee County public safety tower in Batavia. In January 2009, W265BX began serving southern Wyoming County and Livingston County from the hilltop east of Nunda, and in November 2011, WCJW's fourth translator W282BQ commenced service to Le Roy, northern Livingston County, and southwestern Monroe County, including the Interstate 390 corridor from Mount Morris to Henrietta. In April 2015, W285EZ began operation at the WLKK tower site in Wethersfield, employing a directional pattern that serves Arcade, Yorkshire, Delevan and Bliss.  All six translators transmit in stereo and employ the Radio Data System.

History
WCJW began broadcasting on May 16, 1973.  It was a daytimer under the ownership of broadcast engineer John Weeks, who had spent much of his career on the engineering staff of WJR in Detroit. Weeks envisioned a family-oriented operation, with his wife Catherine and daughters Carolyn and Jill filling early staff positions at the station. WCJW's original music format took an easy listening / MOR approach, later dubbed "The Heart of Western New York".

Upon Weeks' retirement in September 1984, the station was purchased by Warsaw resident Lloyd Lane and a group of local investors. A format change to country music in 1986 brought increased support from listeners in this rural region of upstate New York with a local economy based primarily on dairy farming. In 1996, The station was awarded a New York State Broadcasters Association award for best small market play-by-play for high school football by Seth Fenton and Tom LaDelfa. At the time, due to its daytime only status, WCJW pre-recorded Friday night games to air on Saturday morning, and broadcast live daylight games in the afternoon. In 1999, the station's nominal power was raised to 2,500 watts, and in 2014 the power was increased again to 8,000 watts.

Prior to adding the FM translators in 2008, WCJW was a daytime-only station. The AM station remains on the air only during the daytime, as it occupies a clear channel and must vacate the channel at night to allow WRVA in Richmond, Virginia to use the frequency.

As part of a longstanding legal fiction, WCJW officially "shared" its studios with WLKK in Wethersfield. In reality WLKK never used WCJW's studios, which were leased by Buffalo-based broadcasters to comply with the FCC's main studio rule, which has since been rescinded.

In an interesting historical footnote, the call letters WCJW had previously been assigned to an FM station in Cleveland, OH on the frequency of 104.1 from 1968 to 1971. That station had also switched to a country music format during the use of these call letters. In 1971 the station was sold and became WQAL.

Awards
In 2007, WCJW was recognized by New Music Weekly magazine as the Country Radio Station of the Year at the New Music Awards.
In 2019 and 2020, Program Director Jimi was nominated twice for Small Market Music Director of the Year by Country Aircheck, a country radio trade publication. 
In 2021, Jamm won the Randy Jones Memorial Award, which is given for charitable work in the community and for the promotion and preservation of country music through the station,\

References

External links
WCJW Website

CJW
Country radio stations in the United States
Radio stations established in 1973
1973 establishments in New York (state)
CJW